The Liberal Party of Gibraltar (Libs or LPG) is a liberal political party in Gibraltar. It was founded in 1991 as the Gibraltar National Party and is led by Dr. Joseph Garcia. The LPG forms the GSLP–Liberal Alliance in partnership with the Gibraltar Socialist Labour Party.

Policy
In line with most liberal parties, the party describes their political philosophy as being based on notions of people deciding their own future, and are committed to Gibraltarian self-determination regarding constitutional arrangements.

The party believes in "freedom, responsibility, tolerance, social justice and equality of opportunity: these are the central values of liberalism, and they remain the principles on which an open society must be built. These principles require a careful balance of strong civil societies, democratic government, free markets, and international cooperation".

The party makes its stance on economic policy very clear, stating that "open societies need open markets. A liberal, open and tolerant society requires a market economy. Political freedom and economic freedom belong together".

Elections

In the 1992 election to the Gibraltar House of Assembly, the party (as the GNP) won 4.7%% of the popular vote and no seats.

In the 1996 election the GNP won 4.68% of the popular vote and no seats.

In the 1999 by-election, following the death of GSLP Opposition MP Robert Mor, Liberal Party leader Dr. Joseph Garcia won 51.46% of the popular vote and the seat. He was the first joint GSLP/Liberal candidate to contest an election.

In the 2000 election the party won (in alliance with the GSLP) 14.95% of the popular vote and 2 seats.

In the 2003 election the party won (in alliance with the GSLP) 14.61% of the popular vote and 2 seats.

In the 2007 election to the newly named (and re-organized) Gibraltar Parliament, the party won (in alliance with the GSLP) 13.65% of the popular vote and 3 seats.

In the 2011 election, the party won (in alliance with the GSLP) 14.64% of the popular vote and 3 seats forming the new Government of Gibraltar.

In the 2013 by-election, following the death of Housing Minister Charles Bruzon (GSLP), the Liberal Party backed the GSLP candidate Albert Isola, who has won 49.84% of the popular vote to fill in the vacant seat.

In the 2015 election, the party won (in alliance with the GSLP) 20.61% of the popular vote and 3 seats.

Election results

Parliament of Gibraltar

By-elections

European Parliament
Gibraltar was part of the South West England constituency in the European parliament and its major parties formed joint ticket alliances with the major UK parties. From 2004 until Brexit, the Liberal Party of Gibraltar was in an alliance with the Liberal Democrats.

Affiliations
The Liberal Party of Gibraltar is a member of the Liberal International and the Alliance of Liberals and Democrats for Europe, having joined the latter in November 2014. It is also a 'Sister Party' of the United Kingdom Liberal Democrats and contested the South-West England constituency at European Parliamentary elections on a joint ticket with them taking place six on the party list.

Current LPG MPs
Joseph Garcia (since 1999)
 Steven Linares (since 2000)
 Vijay Daryanani (since 2019)

See also
List of liberal parties

References

External links
Official website
Former official website

1991 establishments in Gibraltar
Liberal parties in Gibraltar
Alliance of Liberals and Democrats for Europe Party member parties
Political parties established in 1991
Gibraltarian nationalism
Liberal International
Liberal parties in British Overseas Territories
Pro-European political parties in the United Kingdom